Deskbar may refer to:

 A software user interface for Google Desktop embedded in the taskbar that mainly consists of a Google search textfield
 Deskbar, a taskbar equivalent for BeOS currently provided by the OpenTracker project
 Deskbar, a fork of the BeOS Deskbar for the Haiku operating system. 
 DeskBar, a hidden feature in Windows 98.
 Deskbar, an applet for the GNOME desktop environment.